Khil or KHIL may refer to
KHIL, a radio station serving Willcox, Arizona, United States
Khil Raj Regmi (born 1949), Prime Minister of Nepal
 Eduard Khil (1934–2012), Soviet and Russian baritone singer
Khil Fiat Kikan, a village in Iran

See also
Hil (disambiguation)